Game for Sale is the second collaborative album by American rappers Daz Dillinger and JT the Bigga Figga. It was released on March 6, 2001, via Get Low Recordz.

Track listing

Charts

References

2001 albums
Daz Dillinger albums
JT the Bigga Figga albums
Collaborative albums